The 2nd Carabinier Regiment (French: 2ème Régiment des Carabinier) was a French cavalry regiment.

The Napoleonic Wars

War of the fourth Coalition
It took part in the Battle of Jena–Auerstedt in Joachim Murat's Reserve Cavalry.

References

Cavalry regiments of France
Regiments of the First French Empire